Petrislav may refer to:
Petrislav of Diokleia
Petrislav of Rascia